Marco Zanon (born 6 May 1956) is an Italian biathlete. He competed in the 20 km individual event at the 1984 Winter Olympics.

References

External links
 

1956 births
Living people
Italian male biathletes
Olympic biathletes of Italy
Biathletes at the 1984 Winter Olympics
Sportspeople from Trentino